Hiuchi, also Hiuchigatake is a 2,356 m tall stratovolcano mountain in Oze National Park, and located in Hinoemata Village, Minami-Aizu gun, Fukushima Prefecture, Japan. This is the highest mountain in Tōhoku region. It is one of the 100 Famous Japanese Mountains.

Morphology

Hiuchi initially formed around 350,000 years ago. Around 160,000–170,000 years ago, Hiuchi erupted, creating a large pyroclastic flow deposit. At the summit of the volcano lie two lava domes, Akanagure (赤ナグレ) and Mi-ike (御池岳). Akanagure, the southern dome, produced a series of viscous lava flows that flowed down the southern and western parts of the volcano about 3500 years ago. Mi-ike is responsible for the only recorded activity.

Historic eruptions

1544 eruptions
The only recorded activity was on July 28, 1544. A moderate phreatic eruption at the Mi-ike Lava Dome produced lahars and an associated tephra layer.

See also 
 Asteroid 6883 Hiuchigatake, named after Hiuchigatake
 List of volcanoes in Japan
 List of mountains in Japan

References

Further reading

External links

 National catalogue of the active volcanoes in Japan: Hiuchigatake - Japan Meteorological Agency
  Quaternary Volcanoes: Hiuchigatake - Geological Survey of Japan, AIST
 
 Volcanolive.com

Volcanoes of Japan
Active volcanoes
National parks of Japan
Mountains of Fukushima Prefecture
Highest points of Japanese national parks